Thunderpussy is the self-titled debut studio album by the Seattle hard rock band Thunderpussy. It was produced and engineered by Sylvia Massy. Work on the recording began in September 2016 at Massy's home studio, Foundation Soundstage, in Ashland, Oregon. The first single, "Velvet Noose," was recorded at Hockey Talkter Studios, produced by Mike McCready and engineered by Josh Evans. The album was released on May 25, 2018.

The band included the eponymous track "Thunderpussy" on this album as their theme song, commenting "Every band should have a theme song, especially if your band is called 'Thunderpussy'." They remarked, "This was our big chance to do what we had always wanted since the first time we heard 'Bad Company' by Bad Company: write a self-titled track."

Track listing
All songs by Whitney Petty and Molly Sides
"Speed Queen" – 4:08
"Badlands" – 3:43
"Fever" – 4:55
"Torpedo Love" – 5:11
"Velvet Noose" – 3:44
"Gentle Frame" – 3:15
"All In" – 4:08
"The Cloud" – 4:34
"Pick It Up" – 3:32
"Utero Tango" – 3:59
"Thunderpussy" – 3:58
"Young and Pure" – 6:16

Personnel
Thunderpussy
Molly Sides – vocals, theremin
Whitney Petty – guitars, backing vocals, harmonica
Leah Julius – bass guitar, backing vocals
Ruby Dunphy – drums, percussion, vibraphone
Additional musicians
Mike McCready – guitar on "Velvet Noose" and "The Cloud"
Josh Evans – mellotron on "The Cloud"; stylophone and Fender Rhodes on "Pick It Up"
Graig Markel – acid eagle noises on "Thunderpussy"
Jordan Volker – violin on "Torpedo Love"
Brianna Atwell – viola on "Torpedo Love"
Alex Ho – cello on "Torpedo Love"

References

External links
 Video of "Speed Queen," directed by Cheryl Ediss
 Video of "Torpedo Love," directed by Andrew Franks

2018 albums
Thunderpussy albums